Why You Runnin' is the debut EP by American singer-songwriter Lissie, released in November 2009 on Fat Possum. It was produced by Bill Reynolds of Band of Horses. One of the songs, "Oh Mississippi" was co-written with Ed Harcourt, whom she met through a mutual friend. The EP was listed amongst Paste magazine's "Eight Most Auspicious Musical Debuts of 2009".

Three of the five tracks were later reissued in her debut full-length album Catching a Tiger.

Track listing

References

2009 debut EPs
Lissie albums